Hinchingbrooke School is a large secondary school situated on the outskirts of Huntingdon in Cambridgeshire, historically in Huntingdonshire. Originally all of the surrounding land—including what is now Huntingdon Town—comprised the grounds of Hinchingbrooke House. There is still an avenue of trees leading from the start of Hinchingbrooke House towards the town, which was the old entranceway through the grounds. It is now an academy.

History
Hinchingbrooke School was founded as Huntingdon Grammar School in 1565. Among its pupils in its early history were Oliver Cromwell and Samuel Pepys.

On 1 September 1939 it opened in a new building on Brampton Road. The girls from Highbury Hill High School in London were evacuated for safety and attended the premises from 1939 to 1943. In 1970 the school began to take pupils of all abilities and soon became fully comprehensive. At the same time the school changed its name and moved to new premises in Hinchingbrooke Park and the renovated Hinchingbrooke House.

In 2006 Hinchingbrooke School became a Specialist Sports College. It is now an academy.

Hinchingbrooke sixth form
The sixth form is located in the historic Hinchingbrooke House itself, with most classrooms and student areas within the Grade I listed building.

Hinchingbrooke main school
The main school includes sports facilities, such as a swimming pool, the Fisherhall Dance Studio, a 3rd generation Artificial Grass Pitch and a fitness suite. Some of these are open to the public. A new sports hall has recently been constructed.

Notable former pupils
 Nick Knight (photographer) OBE
 Darren Bent (footballer)
 Jamie Morrison (musician and producer)

Hinchingbrooke sixth form
 Carla Humphrey (footballer)

Huntingdon Grammar School
 Charles Fraser Beckingham, academic
 Potto Brown, philanthropist
 John Butcher, Conservative MP from 1979–97 for Coventry South West
 Patrick Collinson CBE, historian
 Oliver Cromwell, Lord Protector from 1653–58
 Robert William Edis, architect
 Sir Michael Foster (physiologist)
 Amaryllis Garnett, actress, daughter of author David Garnett of the Bloomsbury Group
 Charles Goodchap, Australian politician
 Liz Hodgkinson, author
 Tom Margerison, Chief Executive from 1969–71 and Chairman from 1971–75 of London Weekend Television (LWT)
 Paul Northfield, record producer
 Albert Peatfield, cricketer
 Samuel Pepys, diarist (briefly in 1644)
 Matthew Robinson, television and film director and producer 
 Richard Rutt CBE, Bishop of Leicester from 1979–90
 Mark Souster, sports correspondent, former Rugby Correspondent for The Times
 Charity Taylor, pioneering prison governor, married to Stephen Taylor, Baron Taylor

References

Academies in Cambridgeshire
Educational institutions established in the 1560s
1565 establishments in England
Secondary schools in Cambridgeshire
Huntingdon